Synanthedon soffneri is a moth of the family Sesiidae. It is found in France, Germany, Switzerland, Austria, Poland, the Czech Republic, Slovakia, Slovenia, Finland and Russia.

The wingspan is 22–23 mm.

The larvae feed on Lonicera species, including Lonicera nigra, Lonicera xylosteum and Lonicera tatarica.

References

Moths described in 1983
Sesiidae
Moths of Europe